Singam 3 (Shortened as Si3 or S3) is a 2017 Indian Tamil-language action film written and directed by Hari. A sequel to Singam II (2013) and the third film in the Singam film series, it stars Suriya and Anushka Shetty, where Anushka Shetty plays an important extended Cameo role as main lead (both of whom reprised their roles in the first two films), while Hansika Motwani (who previously played a lead role), plays a cameo role in this series along with Shruti Hassan and Thakur Anoop Singh. It is the fifth collaboration of Suriya and Hari. The film occurs a few months after Singam 2 and focuses on DCP Duraisingam, attempting to solve the murder case of Vizag City Police Commissioner, Ramakrishna.

Principal photography commenced in January 2016 in Visakhapatnam, Andhra Pradesh. The film was released worldwide on 9 February 2017.

Upon release, the film received mixed reviews from critics, and grossed ₹110 crore worldwide.

Plot
A tough debate occurs within an Andhra Pradesh state assembly about the long pending murder case of Visakhapatnam City Police Commissioner Ramakrishna. The Home Minister of Andhra Pradesh proposes recruiting Singam from Tamil Nadu to Vizag as the new DCP, by order under the  CBI. As Singam arrives in Vizag station, he fends off an attack from goon Gun Ravi, who works for Vizag's most influential and powerful don Madhusudhana Reddy. Singam starts to behave as a corrupt cop and secretly investigates the murder of commissioner.

Singam is followed by Vidya, a journalist in guise of a student hoping to write a story on Singam. Singam had previously covered his relationship with his wife Kavya Mahalingam to keep her away from enemies, and after curiosity from Constable Veeram, he closes it as a divorce, revealing it only to Inspector Subba Rao. After briefly confronting Bheemli Selvam, Reddy's man who ordered the attack at the train station, Singam finds that a constable at the station has gotten sick from consuming an expired medicine tablet. With help from a paroled hacker named Murali, Singam tracks Mallaiya who drove Ramakrishna to Vizag harbour on the night of the murder.

A local schoolteacher informs Singam that a toxic smoke attack from the nearby dump killed his 32 students, including his grandchildren. Singam realizes that Ramakrishna intended to expose illegal dumping of mediwaste and electronic waste, which included recycled tablets being sold to the public and the smoke attack on the school. The garbage is being imported by Vizag Scraps owner Rajeev Krishna in exchange for free metal scrap delivery to steel companies in Australia. Mallaiya confirms that Reddy, who authorizes this business in India killed Ramakrishna to prevent him from thwarting his operation.

Reddy and Rajeev's activities are supervised by wealthy, powerful and corrupt current Commercial Minister of Australia and Businessman, Vittal Prasad, who receives full support from his father, Union Minister Ram Prasad. In the meantime, Vidya writes an article on Singam claiming that he exported Reddy for personal gain and that he is corrupt, putting Singam's reputation at edge. As a result, he has Vidya arrested and fined for discrediting him. Singam begins to eliminate and arrest criminals all over the city, including Selvam whom he guns down. Later, Singam heads to Vizag harbour to obtain evidence from Reddy's containers but is attacked by his men while Ravi murders the school teacher.

Vittal calls Singam anonymously and threatens to use his influence to kill Singam's family if he doesn't stand down. The next day, Singam chases down Ravi and arrests Reddy. He pays a personal visit to Vittal in Australia from looking into Reddy's contacts, and confirms that he is the one behind the illegal dumping. He narrowly escapes Vittal and returns to India, where he finds that Reddy has been bailed by three criminals, who framed the Commissioner for supposed assault on one of their wives, and justify the murder as vengeance. Singam is also fired from the CBI for speaking out of turn, but has the home minister transfer him as a Andhra pradesh cop in Vizag to continue pursuing Reddy's men.

Singam exposes the garbage containers to the public, forcing Vittal to come to Vizag. When Vittal warns him again to stay out of his way, Singam responds by having Subbu Rao kill Reddy, whom previously killed his nine-year-old son in a city riot to defend Ram Prasad's position. Singam brings Vittal to his station and gives him another chance to repent for whom he's hurt. Singam and Kavya later visit Thoothukudi to attend Kavya's grandma's funeral. They are followed by Rajeev, who is arrested. When Vidya attempts to interview Vittal, she is captured and drugged. With help from Murali, Singam rescues Vidya but is targeted by Vittal's men who bombs the police station.

Singam decides to finish this once and for all and gets an arrest warrant for Vittal using computer evidence of agreements signed with medical companies, hacked by Murali. The next day, Singam pursues Vittal all the way to Hyderabad Airport in Telangana and has him arrested. Vittal escapes custody into a nearby forest, where Singam catches him and after a long fight, Vittal dies there. Singam regains his post and respect while Ram Prasad is removed from cabinet position for assisting his son. Kavya is revealed to be 6 months pregnant and Vidya severs contact with Singam after getting engaged to a good prospect. Singam receives a call from Home Minister Ramanathan, who calls him for another mission.

Cast

Production
Following the commercial success of Singam 2, Hari was keen to collaborate with Suriya for another action film with a fresh script away from the Singam franchise, and agreed terms in principle with the actor in October 2014. Hari revealed that as a result of pressure from those around him, he later developed the one-line story from the film into a script for a third part of Singam. While the first film was primarily shot within Tamil Nadu and the second featured a few scenes in South Africa, Hari stated that the third part would be more "international" and would be set in three countries as the protagonist tackles a global issue.

While most of the cast was retained from the earlier films, Initially  Akshara Hasan  was considered for the second female lead but she opted out the film then Shruti Haasan was added to the team in July 2015 to portray another leading female role, while Anirudh Ravichander was signed as the music composer replacing Devi Sri Prasad. Anirudh later opted out of the project citing scheduling issues and Harris Jayaraj was brought in to compose the film's music. Vivek, who portrayed the police officer Erimalai in the first two films, declined to reprise his role in this film as he felt he "did not have a meaty role in it". New actors to the series including Raadhika, Soori, Robo Shankar, Krish and Nithin Sathya were added to the cast, while Thakur Anoop Singh was signed on to portray the lead antagonist. In preparation for his role, Suriya bulked up his physique by spending more hours in the gym and by adopting a strict oil-free diet.

The start of the film's shoot, initially scheduled for December 2015, was delayed as a result of the 2015 South Indian floods. Production began in Visakhapatnam during January 2015 with scenes featuring Shruti Haasan as a journalist being shot. Following a series of action sequences shot in the city, the team moved to film song sequences in Romania with Anushka joining the team. After a production break, the team restarted the shoot in Visakhapatnam, before moving to the Talakona Forest region and then on the AVM Studios in Chennai during mid-2016. The team moved to Malaysia to finish filming the climax in October 2016, before a further song was shot in Georgia with Suriya and Shruti Haasan. In January 2017, the film was re-titled from S3 to Si3 (spelt சி3 in Tamil) to exploit the Tamil Nadu Government's rule of entertainment tax exemption for films titled in Tamil.

Release
Singam 3 went through several changes of release date, before being released on 9 February 2017 coinciding with Thaipusam festival. The film was completed in mid-2016 and the team completed post-production work aiming to have a theatrical release in October to coincide either with the Ayudha Puja or Diwali season, but the release was postponed to avoid a box office clash with Suriya's brother, Karthi's film, Kaashmora. The film was then scheduled to release on 16 December. However, due to a request from the makers of Dhruva, the film release date was pushed even later on 23 December to make most of the Christmas holiday season, but was delayed after the team chose to allow the public of Tamil Nadu more time to recuperate from the aftermath of Cyclone Vardah, the death of Chief Minister J. Jayalalithaa and the demonetisation problems. Prior to the film's revised release date of 26 January, PETA India had remarked that Suriya was trying to garner publicity for Si3 by speaking out against the organisation at the 2017 pro-jallikattu protests. Suriya subsequently filed a legal notice against PETA for the defamatory allegations. The film was pushed back even further following riots in Chennai at the end of the protest, with the producers finalising a worldwide theatrical release date of 9 February. In Malaysia, this movie was available in Astro First channel 481 in early April 2017. Viewers need to pay RM15.00 to watch the movie for two days. The first premiere of this movie was in Astro Vinmeen Channel 231(HD) during the festive weekend of Hari Raya Haji and further premiered in Astro Vellithirai Channel 202 on Diwali 2017.The satellite rights of Si3 were sold to Sun TV.Amazon has acquired the digital rights of Si3.

Critical reception
Times of India stated that the delayed release " did not seem to deter Duraisingam from roaring loud, making swift actions, bashing up the baddies uncompromisingly and winning applause from his colleagues as well as the audience", while also lauding Suriya and Hari's contribution to the film. The critic rated 3 out of 5 and wrote "Suriya, who carries the entire film on his shoulders, is in full form — Duraisingam looks as intense, brave and energetic as he appeared more than six years ago", and "director Hari's consistency in handling cop stories convincingly and entertainingly needs to be commended as he has been proving his expertise repeatedly". The New Indian Express also gave 3 out of 5 for the film and gave positive review, stating "In Si3, Suriya proves with the third film of the franchise that no one can play Durai Singam better than him", while analysing that "Hari maintains a sense of urgency in his films from the beginning to end, but, as a commercial film director, his storytelling methods also suffer from following a set of rules, which include frequent yawn-inducing songs", though added that "he makes up for that formulaic approach with fast-paced narration in the scenes that follows". Behindwoods rated the film 2.75 out of 5 and stated that "Durai Singam strikes again! Suriya and Hari don't disappoint you in this Singam franchise". In contrast, the critic from The Hindu gave 2 out of 5 and stated that the film was "loud, fast, and without a single memorable moment". Likewise, Sify called the film "a cocktail of harebrained predictable plot, exhausting action scenes and slapstick comedy", while concluding it was "loud and exhausting".

Box office 
The film collected  at the worldwide box office in its opening four-day weekend. The film collected  worldwide in 6 days.

Soundtrack

The film's soundtrack is scored by Harris Jayaraj, who replaced Devi Sri Prasad as the composer of the film series. The flim marks the eighth collabration between Suriya after Kaakha Kaakha, Ghajini, Vaaranam Aayiram, Ayan, Aadhavan, 7aum Arivu and Maattrraan (2012).  Taking a break after various schedules of shooting, director Hari and Harris Jayaraj completed the song composing in Bangkok, Thailand. The audio rights of the film was acquired by Eros Music and the complete album was released on 27 November 2016. Reviewing the album, Srivatsan of India Today stated "S3 might not be Harris' best work, but definitely not bad either. Having said that, it's a pucca ( really) commercial album from the composer. Be it the songs or the theme music, the album has enough scope to pander to the B and C centers".

Remake
The film is set to be remade in Hindi with Thakur Anoop Singh, who played the antagonist in the original, playing the lead role essayed by Suriya. The remake will be directed by Guddu Dhanoa and produced by Jayantilal Gada of Pen India Limited.

References

External links
 

2017 films
2010s Tamil-language films
Indian action films
Films directed by Hari (director)
Films scored by Harris Jayaraj
Indian sequel films
2017 masala films
Fictional portrayals of the Tamil Nadu Police
Law enforcement in fiction
Films set in Andhra Pradesh
Films set in Sydney
Films shot in Sydney
Films shot in Visakhapatnam
Films shot in Malaysia
Films shot in Chennai
Films shot in Georgia (country)
Films shot in Tirunelveli
Films shot in Romania
Fictional portrayals of the Andhra Pradesh Police
Films set in Telangana
Singam (film series)
Central Bureau of Investigation in fiction
Fictional portrayals of the Telangana Police
Malware in fiction
2017 action films